Cedar Butte Township is a township in Pennington County, in the U.S. state of South Dakota. Its population was 42 as of the 2010 census.

References

Townships in South Dakota
Townships in Pennington County, South Dakota